Mayport may refer to:
 Mayport (Jacksonville), in Jacksonville, Florida
 Mayport, Pennsylvania
 Naval Station Mayport, in Jacksonville, Florida